Oleksandr Zhabokrytskyy; Aleksandr Zhabokritsky; (born 29 January 1981) is a Ukrainian-born Russian football coach and a former midfielder who is the manager of PFC Yalta.

In 1999 he was called up for military service and served at the Ukrainian frigate Hetman Sahaidachny.

External links
 Profile on Official club Site (Rus)
 Profile on Official FFU Site (Ukr)

1981 births
Living people
People from Uman
Ukrainian footballers
Ukrainian footballers banned from domestic competitions
FC Sevastopol players
Naturalised citizens of Russia
Russian footballers
Crimean Premier League players
Ukrainian sailors
Association football midfielders
FC Sevastopol (Russia) players
Sportspeople from Cherkasy Oblast
Russian football managers